Al-Farūq is a biography of Caliph Umar, written by Shibli Nomani. Umar is universally acknowledged as the first conqueror, founder and administrator of the Muslim Empire. He was known as Al-Farooq ("Distinguisher between truth and false").

Its publication in 1939 was a significant addition to the knowledge and history of Islamic literature. By extensive study of the subject, the author Nomani collected and collated facts which were lying buried in unpublished manuscripts in great libraries of Istanbul, Beirut, Alexandria, Paris, Berlin and London. The book inspired an unparalleled enthusiasm and ran into several editions in a very short period. The book was translated into English by Maulana Zafar Ali Khan and was titled, Al Farooq: The Life of Omar The Great (Second Caliph of Islam).

Translations 
 In Turkish by Umar Rada published 1928.
 In Persian published in Kabul. (By sister of late King Mohammed Nadir Shah)
 In English by Zafar Ali Khan published in New Delhi, India in 1900.
 The latest edition in 1996 was published by Idara Isha'at-e-Diniyaat (Center of Islamic Books).

See also
 List of Sunni books

References

External links 

Sunni literature
Books of Islamic biography
Indian non-fiction books
20th-century Indian books
Indian religious texts
Islamic literature
Books by Shibli Nomani
1899 non-fiction books
Caliphates
Deobandi literature
1899 books